Super Aguri may refer to a number of motor racing teams associated with former racing driver Aguri Suzuki:

Super Aguri F1, a Formula One team
Super Aguri (Formula E team), a Formula E team
Super Aguri Fernandez Racing, an IndyCar team
Funai Super Aguri, a former Formula Nippon team